The 2020 United States Senate election in Minnesota was held on November 3, 2020, to elect a member of the United States Senate to represent the State of Minnesota, concurrently with the 2020 U.S. presidential election, as well as other elections to the U.S. Senate, elections to the United States House of Representatives and other state and local elections. Some Republican pundits and strategists believed Minnesota to be a potential pickup opportunity due to its increasingly favorable demographics and unexpectedly close result in the 2016 presidential election, along with potential backlash from the 2020 George Floyd protests, originating after the murder of George Floyd in Minneapolis. But every poll showed incumbent Democratic Senator Tina Smith in the lead by varying degrees.

Smith was reelected to a full term in office by a margin of 5.2 points, making this the closest Senate election in Minnesota since 2008. Some have attributed this to two pro-marijuana legalization parties (Legal Marijuana Now Party and Grassroots Party) taking a combined 7.69% of the vote. The filing deadline for all candidates was June 2, 2020. The primary took place on August 11.

Democratic primary

Candidates

Nominee
Tina Smith, incumbent U.S. Senator

Eliminated in primary
Steve Carlson, candidate for U.S. Senate in 2018 and write-in candidate for president in 2016
Ahmad Hassan
Paula Overby, Green Party nominee for U.S. Senate in 2018
Christopher Seymore, Sr.

Withdrawn
W.D. "Bill" Hamm
Alexandra Marie Holker

Endorsements

Results

Republican primary

Candidates

Nominee
Jason Lewis, former U.S. Representative for Minnesota's 2nd congressional district

Eliminated in primary
John L. Berman
Bob Carney Jr.
Cynthia Gail, art teacher
James Reibestein

Withdrawn
Rob Barrett Jr., assistant professor at North Central University
Christopher Chamberlin, candidate for governor, U.S. senator, and U.S. representative in 2018 and libertarian activist
Forest Hyatt, Republican candidate for the 2018 United States Senate special election in Minnesota
Theron Preston Washington

Declined
Donna Bergstrom, nominee for Lieutenant Governor of Minnesota in 2018
Kurt Daudt, minority leader of the Minnesota House of Representatives
Bill Guidera, attorney and former 21st Century Fox executive
Karin Housley, state senator and Republican nominee for U.S. Senate in 2018
Mike Lindell, CEO of My Pillow
Doug Wardlow, former state representative and Republican nominee for Attorney General of Minnesota in 2018

Endorsements

Results

Other candidates

Grassroots - Legalize Cannabis

Nominee
Oliver Steinberg

Results

Legal Marijuana Now

Nominee
Kevin O'Connor

Primary results

Independent write-in candidate

Declared
George Dennis Jr.
Josh D. Ondich, perennial candidate

General election

Debate

Two general election debates were held. The first, on October 2, 2020, was hosted by Minnesota Public Radio and was attended by Smith and Lewis. The second debate was hosted by Twin Cities PBS on October 23, 2020, and attended only by Lewis.

Predictions

Endorsements

Polling

with Generic Democrat and Generic Republican

Results 

Counties that flipped from Democratic to Republican
 Beltrami (largest municipality: Bemidji)
 Kittson (largest municipality: Hallock)
 Koochiching (largest municipality: International Falls)
 Mower (largest municipality: Austin)
 Norman (largest municipality: Ada)

See also
 2020 Minnesota elections

Notes

Partisan clients

References

External links
Elections & Voting - Minnesota Secretary of State
 
 
  (State affiliate of the U.S. League of Women Voters)
 

Official campaign websites
 Jason Lewis (R) for Senate
 Tina Smith (DFL) for Senate

2020
Minnesota
United States Senate